Interstate 4 (I-4) is an Interstate Highway located entirely within the US state of Florida, maintained by the Florida Department of Transportation (FDOT). Spanning  along a generally southwest–northeast axis, I-4 is entirely concurrent with State Road 400 (SR 400). In the west, I-4 begins at an interchange with I-275 in Tampa. I-4 intersects with several major expressways as it traverses Central Florida, including US Highway 41 (US 41) in Tampa; US 301 near Riverview; I-75 near Brandon; US 98 in Lakeland; US 27 in unincorporated Davenport; US 192 in Celebration; Florida's Turnpike in Orlando; and US 17 and US 92 in multiple junctions. In the east, I-4 ends at an interchange with I-95 in Daytona Beach, while SR 400 continues for roughly another  and ends at an intersection with US 1 on the city line of Daytona Beach and South Daytona.

Construction on I-4 began in 1958; the first segment opened in 1959, and the entire highway was completed in 1965. The "I-4 Ultimate" project oversaw the construction of variable-toll express lanes and numerous redevelopments through the  stretch of highway extending from Kirkman Road (SR 435; exit 75) in Orlando to SR 434 (exit 94) in Longwood. The project broke ground in 2015, and the express lanes opened to traffic on February 26, 2022. Previously, the median of I-4 between Tampa and Orlando was the planned route of a now-canceled high-speed rail line. From a political standpoint, the "I-4 corridor" is a strategic region given the large number of undecided voters in a large swing state.

Route description

I-4 maintains a diagonal, northeast–southwest route for much of its length, although it is signed east–west. It roughly follows the original path of the Sanford-Tampa Line built by Henry B. Plant in 1884.

The highway starts its eastward journey at an interchange with I-275—known as "Malfunction Junction"—near Downtown Tampa and is the starting point for milemarkers and exit numbers (which are mileage-based). Just east of Malfunction Junction, I-4 passes along the north side of Tampa's Ybor City district, where a mile-long connector links to the Lee Roy Selmon Expressway (SR 618) and Port Tampa Bay. I-4 continues east past the Florida State Fairgrounds toward a turbine interchange (uncommon in the US) with I-75.

After passing near the eastern suburbs of Hillsborough County—including Brandon and Plant City—it enters Polk County, where I-4 crosses along the north side of Lakeland. The Polk Parkway (SR 570) forms a semi-loop through Lakeland's southern suburbs and returns to I-4 at the Florida Polytechnic University campus, near Polk City; it does not serve as a bypass route for I-4 traffic. Just after the western junction with the Polk Parkway, I-4 turns from an eastward to a northeastward heading. Between SR 33 (at exit 38) and US 27, I-4 passes through the fog-prone Green Swamp, although the landscape beside the highway is mostly forest as opposed to water-logged swampland. Ten variable-message signs and dozens of cameras and vehicle detection systems monitor this stretch of mostly-rural highway as a result of several large, deadly pileups caused by dense fog.

At mile 57, I-4 enters Osceola County and, soon thereafter, intersects Greater Orlando's beltways: the incomplete Western Expressway (SR 429) on the western side and the Central Florida GreeneWay (SR 417) which rounds the eastern side before returning to I-4 in Sanford. Additionally, an exit to World Drive (signed as just "Disney World") runs north as a limited-access highway into Walt Disney World and an electric pylon in the shape of Mickey Mouse can be seen on the southwest corner of the intersection. The single Central Florida GreeneWay/World Drive exit (exit 62) also marks an abrupt change from rural to suburban/urban landscape. The highway passes beside Celebration and Kissimmee on the east side and Walt Disney World (not visible) on the west side.

For the next , I-4 passes through Greater Orlando, where the highway forms the main north–south artery. It enters Orange County, passes through Walt Disney World and by SeaWorld Orlando and Universal Orlando, and intersects all of the area's major toll roads, including the Beachline Expressway (SR 528), Florida's Turnpike, and the East–West Expressway (SR 408). Between Michigan Street and Kaley Avenue (about mile 81), I-4 turns due north (while still being signed east–west), heading past Downtown Orlando and its northern suburbs. A  section of I-4 from west of SR 435 to east of SR 434 (miles 75–96) underwent a $2.3-billion reconstruction, and was completed on February 26, 2022. This project replaced most bridges, changed the configurations of many intersections, and added two express toll lanes—named I-4 Express—in each direction.

After passing along the west side of Downtown Orlando, I-4 continues through the city's northern suburbs—including Winter Park, Maitland, Altamonte Springs, and Sanford. Around mile 91, I-4 enters Seminole County and, soon thereafter, shifts to a northeast heading. The Seminole Expressway (SR 417), after passing around the east side of Greater Orlando, has its northern terminus (exit 101B) at I-4 in Sanford. This intersection will also connect with the Wekiva Parkway (SR 429), currently under construction, when it is completed in mid-2023, at which point a full beltway (SR 429/SR 417; concurrent with I-4 for ) around Greater Orlando will be available. On October 21, 2022, the first part of this connection opened to traffic, with the westbound I-4 to southbound SR 429 ramp opening to traffic, along with the section of the southbound lanes between the ramp and SR 46.

North of Sanford, I-4 is carried by the St. Johns River Veterans Memorial Bridge over the St. Johns River at the mouth of Lake Monroe. Along the bridge, I-4 enters Volusia County and passes Deltona and DeLand. The segment north of SR 44 has been widened from four to six lanes. Completed in winter 2016–2017, the entire length of I-4 has at least six lanes (three or more per direction). I-4 terminates at a junction with I-95 in Daytona Beach. SR 400 continues east into Daytona Beach  to US 1.

Services
I-4 has two pairs of rest areas, one near Polk City and the other near Longwood. At each location, there are separate facilities on opposite sides of the freeway that provide services to traffic in both directions. The rest areas all provide handicapped facilities with restrooms, picnic tables, drinking water, pet exercise areas, outside night lights, telephones, vending machines, and nighttime security.

FDOT closed a pair of rest areas at the Daryl Carter Parkway overpass (mile 70) near Lake Buena Vista in early 1999 and replaced them with retention ponds to serve runoff from an additional lane in each direction of I-4. Another former rest area, without any bathrooms, existed on the eastbound side near mile 127 in Volusia County.

A pair of weigh stations including weigh in motion scales is present at mile 12 between Tampa and Plant City. They were opened in January 2009 to replace a pair just west of the SR 566 interchange at mile 19.

History

I-4 was one of the first Interstate Highways to be constructed in Florida, with the first section opening between Plant City and Lakeland in 1959. By early 1960, the Howard Frankland Bridge was opened to traffic, as well as the segment from the Hillsborough Avenue/US 301 junction in Tampa to Plant City. The stretch from Lake Monroe to Lake Helen, including the original St. Johns River Veterans Memorial Bridge also opened during that period. The segment from Tampa to Orlando was complete by 1962. By the mid-1960s, several segments were already complete, including Malfunction Junction in Tampa and parts of I-4 through Orlando. The original western terminus was set at Central Avenue (County Road 150 [CR 150]) in St. Petersburg, though a non-Interstate extension would have continued south and west to Pasadena. Proposed I-4 was later extended southwest to the present location of I-275 exit 20, with a planned temporary end at US 19 and 13th Avenue South, and a continuation to the Sunshine Skyway Bridge was also designated as part of I-4. Construction was stalled at 9th Street North (CR 803) for several years.

The entire Interstate Highway was completed by the late 1960s; however, the western terminus was truncated to Malfunction Junction in 1971 when I-75 was extended over the Howard Frankland Bridge. Eventually, that stretch was again redesignated to become part of I-275.

In maps and atlases dating to the 1950s, 1960s, and 1970s, the Tampa–St. Petersburg section of I-4/I-275 was marked as the Tampa Expressway. The Orlando segment was marked as the Orlando Expressway. Both names have since faded from maps.

Although many post-1970 interchanges along I-4 were constructed before the recent widening projects, they were designed with I-4 expansion in mind. In other words, there is enough room available to widen I-4 to up to 10 lanes without extensively modifying the interchanges. Some of these interchanges include the I-75 stack (constructed in the 1980s) and several interchanges serving the Walt Disney World Resort (constructed in the late 1980s and early 1990s).

In 2002, I-4, along with most of Florida's Interstates, switched over from a sequential exit numbering system to a mileage-based exit numbering system.

A section of I-4 between Daytona Beach and Orlando, called the "dead zone", is rumored to be haunted. In 2010, the East Central Florida Regional Planning Council (ECFRPC), using geographic information system technology, performed an analysis to determine if this identified zone had an increased fatality rate related to crashes. The analysis, which compared this section of I-4 to several other dangerous I-4 sections, found that, while the dead zone area did not have the highest accident or fatality rate, it did identify that the percentage of fatality to accident was significantly higher in this location. Multiple hurricanes, including three category 4 hurricanes (Donna, Charley, and Ian) have also passed over that area.

The median of I-4 between Tampa and Orlando was slated to be used for the Florida High-Speed Corridor line between those cities. As a result of a state constitutional amendment to build a high-speed rail system between its five largest cities passed by voters in 2000, construction projects on I-4 included a wide median to accommodate a high-speed rail line. The high-speed rail project was canceled in 2004 but revived again in 2009. In 2010, the federal government awarded Florida over $2 billion (equivalent to $ in )—nearly the entire projected construction cost—to build the line, with work on the project to begin in 2011 and be completed by 2014. However, Governor Rick Scott's rejection of the funding ended the project.

On January 9, 2008, 70 vehicles were involved in a large pileup on I-4 near Polk City. The pileup was caused by an unexpected thick morning fog that was mixed with a scheduled—and approved—environmental burn by the Florida Fish and Wildlife Conservation Commission. The fog drifted across I-4, mixing with the smoke and reducing visibility to near-zero conditions. Four people were killed and 38 were injured. The section of I-4 did not reopen until the next day, January 10.

Tampa area

The I-4/I-275 interchange (Malfunction Junction) was rebuilt from 2002 to 2007, and I-4 has been widened from four to six lanes (with eight lanes in certain segments).

Eastbound I-4 shifted to its new, permanent alignment between Malfunction Junction and 50th Street on August 8, 2006. The new alignment includes a right-lane ramp exit/entry at the 22nd Street/21st Street Interchange (the previous left-lane configuration was causing hazardous conditions to commuters since its opening in 2005). On August 11, 2006, a fourth lane opened on eastbound I-4 between the downtown junction and 50th Street (led in by a newly opened third lane on the eastbound I-4 ramp from northbound I-275). And, on August 18, the new westbound alignment, just west of 50th Street, opened. The newly opened lanes will improve flow throughout the interchange. The 50th Street overpass, however, would not be complete until late 2007. Also, the eastbound I-4 exit ramp to Columbus Drive/50th Street is situated to the left-hand side of the highway (as opposed to its former right-hand side exit). This exit shift went into effect in spring 2006 and is part of the new, permanent Interstate configuration.

In Tampa, the exit to 40th Street (SR 569), exit 2, was closed and demolished in late 2005 due to the ongoing reconstruction of I-4 and to accommodate a proposed connector highway with the Lee Roy Selmon Expressway.

The interchange with what is today I-75 was constructed in the early 1980s.

Greater Orlando
As Orlando grew in the 1970s and 1980s, traffic became a growing concern, especially after the construction of the original interchange with the East–West Expressway in 1973, which proved to become a principal bottleneck. The term "highway hostages" was coined in the 1980s to describe people stuck in long commutes to and from Orlando on I-4.

In the early-to-mid-1990s, several interchanges near Kissimmee were constructed or upgraded to accommodate increasing traffic going to and from Walt Disney World. However, I-4's mainlanes were not widened in the process. Around the same time, SR 417 was extended to I-4. Improvements to the US 192 junction were completed in 2007.

The St. Johns River Veterans Memorial Bridge, a two-span, six-lane replacement to the original four-lane bridge over the St. Johns River northeast of Orlando, was completed in 2004.

During the early 2000s, tolled express lanes were being planned in the Orlando area as a traffic congestion relief technique for rush-hour commuters. The name for them was to be Xpress 400, numbered after the state road designation for I-4. The express lanes were slated to extend from Universal Orlando, east to SR 434 in Longwood, and tolls were to be collected electronically via transponders like SunPass and Central Florida Expressway Authority's E-PASS, with prices dependent on the congestion of the eight mainlanes. However, the project was effectively banned by the passage of the Safe, Accountable, Flexible, Efficient Transportation Equity Act: A Legacy for Users federal transportation bill in 2005, introduced by US Representative John Mica. The plan for tolled express lanes is now moving forward as part of the $2.3-billion I-4 Ultimate project.

Interim improvements to the interchange at SR 408 were completed at the end of 2008. The eastbound exit to Robinson Street (SR 526) permanently closed on April 25, 2006, to make way for construction of the new eastbound onramp from SR 408. The westbound offramp to Gore Street was permanently closed in the same project on November 2, 2008.

The new overpass from I-4 west to John Young Parkway (CR 423) opened the morning of April 27, 2006.

Recent history

Recent widening
The final four-lane segment of I-4, from SR 44 to I-95, was widened to six lanes. Completed in winter 2016–2017, the whole highway is at least six lanes wide.

I-4 Ultimate Project

A $2.3-billion (in year-of-expenditure dollars) project—dubbed I-4 Ultimate—is reconstructing a  stretch of I-4 through Orlando from SR 435 (exit 75) east to SR 434 (exit 94). The most noticeable change is the addition of four variable-toll express lanes along this section, called I-4 Express. Additionally, the general-use lanes were rebuilt, 15 major interchanges were reconfigured, 53 new bridges were added, and 75 bridges were replaced. A pedestrian bridge was built over the highway near Maitland Boulevard, with a second pedestrian bridge being built over SR 435 at the intersection with both Major Boulevard and Tom Williams Way. A pedestrian tunnel was constructed under SR 436. The project also reduced the curve radius and improved line-of-sight along the notorious Fairbanks Curve south of Fairbanks Avenue, which is the most accident-prone section of I-4.

FDOT proposed adding barrier-separated high-occupancy vehicle (HOV) lanes to I-4 through Greater Orlando in the 1990s, possibly funded by tolls, but proposals for express lanes (including reversible toll lanes and high-occupancy toll [HOT] lanes) were blocked by politics for the next 15 years. In 2012, a legislative ban on tolls along I-4, which had been in place for seven years, ended, and FDOT began soliciting private enterprises to build and help finance the project in a public–private partnership. In February 2013, the state legislature and governor gave approval for FDOT to proceed with the public–private partnership on this section of I-4 in February 2013, and, the following year, FDOT selected I-4 Mobility Partners to design, construct, finance, maintain, and operate the project for 40 years. FDOT and I-4 Mobility Partners reached commercial and financial close, and a public–private partnership concession agreement was executed in September 2014. The final design phase began in October 2014. On February 1, 2015, FDOT turned the project over to I-4 Mobility Partners, and, on February 18, transportation officials and the governor held a groundbreaking ceremony for the project in Maitland. After seven years of construction, the express lanes opened to traffic the morning of February 26, 2022, and began tolling on March 3, 2022.

Future

I-4 Beyond the Ultimate
I-4 Beyond the Ultimate, which includes proposed extensions of the I-4 Express toll lanes, both southwest and northeast of the I-4 Ultimate project, are being considered. In 2013, FDOT initiated a study to reevaluate previous feasibility studies, made between 1998 and 2005, in which the addition of HOV or express toll lanes were considered. Southwest of the I-4 Ultimate, the study is examining an extension through Osceola County to US 27 in Polk County. Northeast of the I-4 Ultimate, the study is examining an extension through Seminole County to SR 472 in Volusia County.

In addition to these express lane extensions, many interchanges will be reconstructed as part of the project. Some of these reconstructed interchanges will be converted to diverging diamond interchanges, which are proposed at both CR 532 (exit 58; implemented on July 10, 2022) and SR 482 (exit 74A). A brand new interchange at Daryl Carter Parkway is also proposed to be a diverging diamond.

Unlike I-4 Ultimate, where the  encompassed by that project were construed at once, the  encompassed by I-4 Beyond the Ultimate will be constructed in phases.

Additional express lanes
Express toll lanes are also being considered for I-4 in the Tampa Bay area. In January 2015, FDOT unveiled its master plan for a system of express toll lanes—dubbed Tampa Bay Express (TBX)—on I-4, I-75, and I-275 and began public meetings for community input. At the junction with I-275, the initial concept alignment calls for a direct connection between the express toll lanes of both highways. Express bus lanes for regional service and a long-distance bus service were studied for inclusion in the plan. The I-4 corridor was considered in the bus lane study, but the resultant proposal only included installation on I-275 and I-75

Other projects

Connections with two new expressways are planned. The Wekiva Parkway—a  segment of SR 429—will connect to SR 417 at the I-4 interchange in Sanford. When completed in 2023, it will complete the beltway around Orlando, although the southern ends of SR 429 and SR 417 do not connect and are separated by a  drive along I-4. On October 21, 2022, the first part of this connection opened to traffic, with the westbound I-4 to southbound SR 429 ramp opening to traffic, along with the section of the southbound lanes between the ramp and SR 46. The Central Polk Parkway is a planned tolled expressway in eastern Polk County that will connect I-4 near Davenport with the Polk Parkway near Bartow; it is currently in the design phase, but funding for right-of-way acquisition of the initial segments is not planned until fiscal year 2019–2020. Additionally, FDOT is conducting a feasibility study for a  connection between I-4 and the Poinciana Parkway—a short, tolled expressway completed in 2016 between US 17/US 92 and the community of Poinciana.

In 2014, FDOT began a study of the feasibility of extending the SunRail commuter train line to Daytona Beach, primarily focussing on the use of the I-4 median. The ongoing widening project from SR 44 to I-95 maintains a median wide enough to accommodate a future rail line.

Exit list

State Road 400

State Road 400 (SR 400) is an unsigned highway while running concurrently with I-4 from their shared western terminus at I-275 in Tampa through the last eastbound exit before the eastern terminus of I-4, at I-95 in Daytona Beach. SR 400 is named Beville Road beyond I-95 and continues for another  to its own eastern terminus at an intersection with US 1 on the city line between Daytona Beach and South Daytona. Sections of the nonconcurrent SR 400 are classified as a "scenic thoroughfare" within Daytona Beach.

Major intersections

In politics

In the 2004 US presidential election, the I-4 corridor, a commonly used term to refer to the counties in which I-4 runs through and a site of significant population growth, was a focus of political activity within the swing state of Florida. Communities along the I-4 corridor were perceived by both major political parties as having higher proportions of undecided voters as compared to more Republican- or Democratic-leaning portions of the state. It played an equally key role in the 2008 US presidential election, but, whereas the corridor had voted heavily for George W. Bush in 2004, which helped Bush win the state, in 2008, it swung behind Democratic candidate Barack Obama, helping Obama win Florida.

Between 1996 and 2012, the I-4 corridor had voted for the statewide winner. However, in the 2016 and 2020 elections, Republican Donald Trump carried the state without winning the region. The Republicans carried the region three times while the Democrats carried the region five times in the past eight presidential elections. Republicans George H. W. Bush and George W. Bush won more votes than other candidates in 1992, 2000, and 2004, while Democrats Bill Clinton, Barack Obama, Hillary Clinton, and Joe Biden captured the region's vote total in the elections of 1996, 2008, 2012, 2016, and 2020.

See also

War on I-4 – The college rivalry between the University of South Florida and University of Central Florida.
Hurricane Donna (1960) – A category 4 hurricane that tracked directly over I-4.
Hurricane Charley (2004) – Another category 4 hurricane that tracked directly over I-4 and is sometimes referred to as the "I-4 Hurricane"
Hurricane Ian (2022) – A third category 4 hurricane that tracked close to I-4.

References

External links

FDOT websites about Interstate 4:
 Tampa Bay/West Central Florida Roads—current and future projects on I-4 in Hillsborough County
 Central Florida Roads—current and future projects on I-4 in Osceola, Orange, Seminole, and Volusia counties
 I-4 Express—trip planners, FAQs and general information on using the now completed toll-managed express lanes through Orlando.

FDOT websites about specific I-4 projects and proposals:
 I-4 Ultimate—project info about I-4 Ultimate in the Orlando area
 I-4 Beyond the Ultimate—information about proposed extensions of express lanes on both sides of the I-4 Ultimate project.
 Tampa Bay Express—information about the proposed express lanes on Interstates 4, 75, & 275 in the Tampa Bay area.
 I-4 Poinciana Parkway Connector—information about a feasibility study being conducted for a connection between I-4 and the Poinciana Parkway

04
04
Expressways in Florida
Expressways in Orange County, Florida
Expressways in Orlando, Florida
Expressways in Hillsborough County, Florida
Expressways in Tampa, Florida
Expressways in the Tampa Bay area
Transportation in Hillsborough County, Florida
Transportation in Polk County, Florida
Transportation in Osceola County, Florida
Transportation in Orange County, Florida
Transportation in Seminole County, Florida
Transportation in Volusia County, Florida
1959 establishments in Florida